Mary Victoria Penso (born 1985/1986) is an American soccer referee. In 2020, she became the first woman to referee a Major League Soccer regular season match in 20 years.

Career

Penso was raised in Stuart, Florida, and began refereeing in high school alongside her older brothers. She was invited to an Olympic Development Program refereeing camp in Alabama at the age of 18. Penso graduated from Florida State University in 2008 with a digital marketing degree. She worked in marketing for Coca-Cola and Red Bull until relocating to Ohio to earn a Master of Business Administration in 2015 from the Case Western Reserve University.

Penso joined the United States Soccer Federation as a referee in 2013 and was assigned to women's collegiate tournaments and later the National Women's Soccer League (NWSL). Following the 2019 Generation Adidas Cup, she was invited to join the Professional Referee Organization's PRO2 development program. Penso later served as an assistant or fourth official at several Major League Soccer (MLS) and USL Championship matches, in addition to assignments in the NWSL.

In January 2020, Penso was appointed as the managing director of the National Intercollegiate Soccer Officials Association. On September 25, 2020, she became the ninth woman to referee a MLS match and the first since Sandy Hunt in May 2000.

Personal life

Penso is married to Chris Penso, a long-time MLS referee. They have three children.

References

External links
  

1980s births
Living people
American soccer referees
Major League Soccer referees
Date of birth missing (living people)
People from Stuart, Florida
Case Western Reserve University alumni
American women referees and umpires